List of Commonwealth of Nations countries by GDP may refer to:

List of Commonwealth of Nations countries by GDP (nominal), a list using the current exchange rates for national currencies
List of Commonwealth of Nations countries by GDP (PPP), a list using purchasing power parity to derive GDP estimates